Na Renna, or the Kingdom of the Rhinns, was a Norse-Gaelic lordship which appears in 11th century records. The Rhinns was a province in Medieval Scotland, and comprised, along with Farines, the later Wigtownshire.

List of known rulers
Three rulers are explicitly stated in the sources to have ruled this kingdom:

See also
 Diocese of Galloway
 Lord of Galloway
 Mull of Galloway
 Rhins of Galloway
 Stranraer

References

 Byrne, Francis J., "Na Renna", Peritia, vol. 1 (1982), p. 267
 Russell, Paul (ed.), Vita Griffini Filii Conani: The Medieval Latin Life of Gruffudd ap Cynan, (Cardiff, 2005)
 Stokes, Whitley, Félire Óengusso Célí Dé: The Martyrology of Oengus the Culdee, (London, 1905; reprinted, Dublin, 1984)

History of Galloway
Rhinns, Kingdom of the
11th century in Scotland
Scandinavian Scotland
Former monarchies of Europe
Former countries in the British Isles